Vinemont is an unincorporated community in Cullman County, Alabama, United States, located roughly  north of the city of Cullman. The population as of July 2017 was 948.  The community of Vinemont borders the incorporated town of South Vinemont (population 425). Vinemont elementary, middle and high schools are located in South Vinemont.

Notable people
 Don Brandon, longtime college baseball coach at Anderson University in Indiana
 James E. Martin, president of Auburn University from 1984 to 1992 and of the University of Arkansas from 1980 to 1984
 Hank Williams Jr., lived in Vinemont for a good spell.

References

Unincorporated communities in Alabama
Unincorporated communities in Cullman County, Alabama